Anders Bleg Christiansen (born 8 June 1990) is a Danish professional footballer who plays for Allsvenskan club Malmö FF as a midfielder. He also serves as club captain since 2020. He used to play with the nickname 'AC' on the back of his shirt.

Club career

Lyngby BK
Christiansen started his senior career at Lyngby BK. He made his debut in the 2008–09 season, making three league appearances. The following season Christiansen earned more playing time and helped Lyngby achieve promotion to the top flight. He excelled as one of Lyngby's key players in the Danish Superliga for the following two seasons, but could not save the team from relegation in their second season.

FC Nordsjælland
Christiansen's play in the Superliga earned him attention from the reigning champions FC Nordsjælland. On 25 July 2012, Christiansen was presented as a Nordsjælland player after signing a four-year contract. He made 67 league appearances for the club during his two and a half year stint, and appeared in five games in the 2012–13 UEFA Champions League group stage.

Chievo Verona
On 15 January 2015, Christiansen secured a transfer to Serie A club Chievo Verona. During his year in Italy he failed to earn much playing time, appearing in just five games.

Malmö FF
On 26 January 2016, Christiansen was presented as Allan Kuhn's first signing as the newly appointed head coach at Malmö FF. He made his Allsvenskan debut in the season opener against reigning champions IFK Norrköping, where he scored his first goal for the club in a 3–1 win. Christiansen scored five more goals during the 2016 season and played a key role in Malmö's championship winning team until he suffered a season-ending injury with seven games to play. He recovered just in time for the start of the 2017 season, and soon picked up where he left off before the injury. On 7 September 2017, it was announced that Christiansen had extended his contract with Malmö FF over the 2022 season. On 16 October 2017, Christiansen scored a goal and added two assists in Malmö FF's 3–1 victory over IFK Norrköping, which secured the league title with three games to play. After the season, Christiansen was voted Allsvenskan's midfielder of the year and the league's most valuable player. and also in 2020

Gent
On 4 January 2018, he joined Belgian side Gent.

Return to Malmö FF
After a six-month spell at Gent he rejoined Malmö FF in July 2018. Christiansen became club captain ahead of the 2020 season after predecessor Markus Rosenberg retired. Under Christiansen's captaincy, Malmö won the 2020 championship and followed it up by qualifying for the 2021–22 UEFA Champions League group stage.

Personal life
Due to the moderate mutual intelligibility between Danish and Swedish, Christiansen speaks a less dialectal version of his native language to the Swedish press as Malmö captain. He became fully comfortable with comprehending Swedish speech after several years in the country. This caused reactions when the Swedish broadcaster began an interview with him in English in 2020, only for Christiansen to respond that he preferred to do a cross-lingual interview instead.

Christiansen grew up as a supporter of English club Liverpool. During his professional career he has admitted it became a 'bit more distant'.

International career
Christiansen has represented the Denmark national team in three friendlies. After a successful spring in Malmö he got called up by former Malmö coach Åge Hareide in May 2016, but had to decline after suffering a thigh injury. He was, surprisingly to most, included in the 26-man squad for the UEFA Euro 2020 tournament by Denmark coach Kasper Hjulmand.

Career statistics

Honours

Malmö FF
 Allsvenskan: 2016, 2017, 2020, 2021
 Svenska Cupen: 2021–22

Individual
 Allsvenskan Midfielder of the Year: 2017, 2019, 2020
 Allsvenskan Player of the Year: 2017, 2020

References

External links
 Malmö FF profile 
 
 

1990 births
Living people
Footballers from Copenhagen
Association football midfielders
Danish men's footballers
Denmark international footballers
Denmark youth international footballers
Denmark under-21 international footballers
Danish Superliga players
Danish 1st Division players
Serie A players
Allsvenskan players
Belgian Pro League players
Lyngby Boldklub players
FC Nordsjælland players
A.C. ChievoVerona players
Malmö FF players
K.A.A. Gent players
UEFA Euro 2020 players
Danish expatriate men's footballers
Danish expatriate sportspeople in Italy
Expatriate footballers in Italy
Danish expatriate sportspeople in Sweden
Expatriate footballers in Sweden
Danish expatriate sportspeople in Belgium
Expatriate footballers in Belgium